= Jeju-do =

Jeju-do (Korean: 제주도) can either refer to:

- Jeju Island (濟州島), the island in South Korea
- Jeju Province (濟州道), the province in South Korea that includes Jeju Island and other nearby islands
